Adam Urias de Pencier   (1866-1949) was the third Bishop of New Westminster and second Archbishop and Metropolitan of British Columbia.

Born in 1866, he was the great-great grandson of Charles I, Duke of Brunswick-Wolfenbüttel through his ancestor Christian Theodor von Pincier. He was educated at Trinity College in Toronto.

De Prencier was ordained in 1890. He held incumbencies at St Matthew's, Brandon and  St Paul's, Vancouver. He was appointed Bishop, and later Archbishop of the Diocese of New Westminster in 1910 for British Columbia. While serving as bishop, he founded St. John's Shaughnessy on the grounds of the bishop's residence. Prior to retiring in 1940, he was awarded an Honorary Doctor of Laws by the University of British Columbia and the Order of the British Empire by King George V.

References

External links
Services and Prayers Authorized by Adam, Third Bishop of New Westminster, Administrator of the Diocese of Kootenay, for Use in the Diocese of New Westminster and Kootenay, 1911, digitized by Richard Mammana

1866 births
Anglican clergy from London
Trinity College (Canada) alumni
Canadian Officers of the Order of the British Empire
Anglican bishops of New Westminster
20th-century Anglican Church of Canada bishops
20th-century Anglican archbishops
Metropolitans of British Columbia
1949 deaths
British emigrants to Canada